The American Institute of Biological Sciences (AIBS) is a nonprofit scientific charity. The organization’s  mission is to promote the use of science to inform decision-making and advance biology for the benefit of science and society.

Overview 

AIBS serves as a society of societies. AIBS  has over 115 member organizations and is headquartered in Herndon, VA. Its staff work to achieve its mission by publishing the peer-reviewed journal BioScience,  providing  peer review and advisory support services for funding organizations,  providing  professional development for scientists and students, advocating for science policy and educating the public about biology. AIBS works with like-minded organizations, funding agencies, and nonprofit and for-profit entities to promote the use of science to inform decision-making. 

AIBS is governed by an esteemed Board of Directors and a Council of representatives of our member organizations and is guided by its approved strategic plan.

Background and History

AIBS was established in 1947 as a part of the National Academy of Sciences. The overarching goal was to unify the individuals and organizations that collectively represent the biological sciences, so that the community could address matters of common concern.   In the 1950s, AIBS became an independent, member-governed, nonprofit 501(c)3 public charity scientific organization.   The organization  continues to work diligently to communicate biology to the scientific community, funders, policymakers, and other groups interested in exploring cross-cutting ideas in the biological sciences



Strategic Priorities

AIBS works toward overarching outcomes through three strategic priorities:
 
 Scientific Peer Advisory and Review Services for research proposals and programs sponsored by funding organizations, including the federal government, state agencies, private research foundations, other non-government organizations and educate the community about the science of peer review.
 Publications and Communications, including reliable reports, analyses, and the peer-reviewed journal BioScience, which is a forum for integrating the life sciences and educating the public about biological sciences.
 Community Programs that advance the field and profession of biology while promoting and providing leadership, with a particular emphasis on public policy and advocacy, education and professional development, as well as public awareness of science.

Core Activities

AIBS works toward recognizing teaching professionals, collaborating with other organizations, disseminating information, publishing teaching resources to improve biology education, and encouraging students to pursue careers in biology.

Diversity, Equity, and Inclusion

AIBS is committed to increasing diversity, equity, and inclusion (DEI) in the biological sciences.  AIBS is focusing on the development and expansion of programs that center on our core activities of assessment, training, communication, and advocacy.

Assessment

Scientific Peer Advisory and Review Services (SPARS)

The Scientific Peer Advisory and Review Services (SPARS) department is focused on coordinating, facilitating, and promoting independent, equitable evaluation processes to inform decision-making.  

AIBS SPARS partners with a diverse group of organizations that are focused on a wide variety of research and funding efforts.  AIBS SPARS facilitates review/advisory support services to ensure thorough and structured assessment processes are performed by vetted, qualified experts.

AIBS SPARS staff are experts in review processes and advisory services, which are often provided for proposed research grants and progress reports, ongoing funded research programs / portfolios, retrospective impact analyses, and for advisory boards and committees.

Science of Peer Review

The empirical basis upon which peer review rests is limited. To build up this literature base, AIBS SPARS staff perform in-house research and meta-analyses on the peer review process and share results with the scientific community through publications and presentations.

Advocacy

Public Policy Office

The Public Policy Office works to educate policymakers about the importance of investing in biology and advocates for policies that serve the needs of researchers, educators, and other biological science professionals. Issues addressed by the office include but are not limited to: funding for the biological sciences; funding for research infrastructure, including scientific collections and field stations; strengthening science education policy; investing in the scientific workforce; and promoting scientific integrity and transparency.

Training

With over 2,600 people trained, AIBS provides training programs to scientists that enhance their professional skills and opportunities, as well as improve their ability to engage and inform diverse audiences.  Workshops include:

 Employment Acquisition Skills Boot Camp for Scientists: Helping scientists hone and practice the skills needed to secure employment
 Writing for Impact and Influence:  Helping scientists and graduate students hone their written communication skills to increase the impact and influence of their message
 Enabling Interdisciplinary and Team Science:  Providing participants with the knowledge and skills required to become productive and effective members of scientific teams
 Communication Bootcamp:  Helps the science community learn how to engage and inform decision-makers and have the opportunity to become effective and engaged communicators

Communications

Faces of Biology Photo Contest

AIBS conducts a yearly photo contest that helps communicate science through imagery.  Photographs entered into the contest must depict a person, such as a scientist, researcher, collections curator, technician, or student, engaging in biological research. The depicted research may occur outside, in a lab, with a natural history collection, on a computer, in a classroom, or elsewhere.

Publications

AIBS publishes BioScience,  a peer-reviewed monthly journal with content written and edited for accessibility to researchers, educators, and students. The journal is heavily cited, with a 2021 Impact Factor of 11.687. AIBS also publishes BioScience Talks, a companion podcast to the journal.

BioScience includes articles about research findings and techniques, advances in biology education, professionally written feature articles about new developments in biology, discussions of professional issues, book reviews, news about AIBS, and a policy column (Washington Watch). Roundtables, forums, and viewpoint articles offer the perspectives of opinion leaders and invite further commentary.

See also
BioScience

Scientific organizations based in the United States
Non-profit organizations based in Washington, D.C.
Scientific supraorganizations
United States National Academy of Sciences
Peer review
Non-profit academic publishers
Biology organizations based in the United States
Biology societies
Natural Science Collections Alliance members